In Greek mythology, Side (Ancient Greek: Σίδη 'pomegranate) or Sida was the name of the following figures:

 Sida, eponym of the city of Sidon in Phoenicia. She was the wife of Belus, king of Egypt and mother of Aegyptus and Danaus. Otherwise, the wife of Belus was called Achiroe, daughter of the river-god Nilus.
Side, one of the Danaïdes, condemned to Tartarus for murdering her husband. From her, a town in Laconia was believed to derived its name from.
Side, the first wife of Orion and possible mother of his daughters Metioche and Menippe. She was cast by Hera into Hades because she rivaled the goddess in beauty. Modern scholars interpret the supposed marriage of Orion to Side ('pomegranate') as a mythical expression for the ripening of the fruit in the season when the constellation Orion is visible in the night sky.
 Side, a mortal woman who was chased down by her father Ictinus, intending to rape her. Side killed herself on her mother's grave, and the gods turned her blood into a pomegranate tree. Her father was changed into a kite bird that never rested on pomegranate trees.

Notes

References 
 Apollodorus, The Library with an English Translation by Sir James George Frazer, F.B.A., F.R.S. in 2 Volumes, Cambridge, MA, Harvard University Press; London, William Heinemann Ltd. 1921. . Online version at the Perseus Digital Library. Greek text available from the same website.
 Pausanias, Description of Greece with an English Translation by W.H.S. Jones, Litt.D., and H.A. Ormerod, M.A., in 4 Volumes. Cambridge, MA, Harvard University Press; London, William Heinemann Ltd. 1918. . Online version at the Perseus Digital Library
 Pausanias, Graeciae Descriptio. 3 vols. Leipzig, Teubner. 1903.  Greek text available at the Perseus Digital Library.

Danaids
Princesses in Greek mythology
Queens in Greek mythology
Phoenician characters in classical mythology
Condemned souls in Tartarus
Deeds of Hera